Earthsky Pictures, founded in March 2018, is an Indian production company owned by filmmakers and writers, Ashwiny Iyer Tiwari and Nitesh Tiwari.

Productions 

Earthsky's first film, Ghar Ki Murgi starring Sakshi Tanwar, received critical acclaim. It released on SonyLiv in 2020. 

Their recent works include another film directed by Ashwiny Iyer Tiwari, in Ankahi Kahaaniyan, Netflix's anthology and  documentary series, Break Point. The web series was released on Zee5 on 1 October 2021. The docu-series is directed by Ashwiny Iyer Tiwari and Nitesh Tiwari. 

The series is based on the former Indian doubles tennis players partnership and success of Mahesh Bhupathi and Leander Paes. It garnered positive reviews from critics and audience alike. 

Their upcoming films include Tarla starring Huma Qureshi and Sharib Hashmi and Bawaal starring Varun Dhawan and Jahnvi Kapoor.

They also produce ad films.

References 

Film production companies of India
Film production companies based in Mumbai
Indian companies established in 2018
Hindi cinema